Parapoynx vittalis is a moth in the family Crambidae. It was described by Otto Vasilievich Bremer in 1864. It is found in Russia, China, Taiwan and Japan.

The wingspan is 13–17 mm.

References

Acentropinae
Moths described in 1864